Skirö is a small village in Vetlanda Municipality in Sweden. It lies 25 km from the town of Vetlanda in the southeastern part of Jönköping County and has a population of about 70 (2010). Situated in a beautiful setting around Lake Skirö, it was dubbed  ("The Garden of Småland") by Carolus Linnaeus. It was also the birthplace of botanist Eric Ragnar Sventenius (1910–1973).

From 1952 to 1970 Skirö was part of Nye Municipality. Since 1971 it has been in Vetlanda Municipality. The village is about 12 km across and 7 km wide with a total area of ca 44 hectares. There are some large mansions such as Wallby and Gölberga not far from the village.

References

External links 

Skirö homepage

Populated places in Jönköping County